This List of Medal of Honor recipients from the 1st West Virginia Volunteer Cavalry Regiment is sortable by recipient, rank, company, place, date, and reason for the award. The 1st West Virginia Volunteer Cavalry Regiment served in the Union Army during the American Civil War.

Background 
The First Virginia Cavalry, later to be renamed the 1st West Virginia Cavalry Regiment, was formed during the summer and fall of 1861 to fight for the Union in the American Civil War. (Do not confuse this regiment with the Confederate 1st Virginia Cavalry.) Although it started slowly, it became one of the most effective of all West Virginia regiments. The regiment had more Medal of Honor recipients than any other West Virginia regiment. The majority of its fighting took place in Virginia and what is now West Virginia, although the regiment also fought in Maryland and Pennsylvania (including the Battle of Gettysburg). The regiment participated in most of Sheridan's Shenandoah Valley Campaign, and was present at Robert E. Lee's surrender of the Army of Northern Virginia at Appomattox. The regiment mustered out July 8, 1865. It lost 10 officers and 71 enlisted men killed or mortally wounded, and 126 enlisted men died from disease.

Notes

Footnotes

Citations

References

 
 
 
 

Cavalry
West Virginia Cavalry
West Virginia-related lists